The Cafeteros de Córdoba or Córdoba Coffee Growers was a Mexican League baseball team that played on-and-off from 1937 to 2006. 

The team played on and off for a duration not last more than a decade:

 1937 to 1939
 1972 to 1979
 1984 to 1986
 1991 to 1992
 1998 to 2003 
 2006

Championships

It won the league championship in 1939 and 1972.

Ballpark

Other than the first two seasons, the team has played its home games at Estadio De Béisbol Beisborama 72. From 1937 to 1939 the team played at Parque Cuauhtémoc de Monterrey in Monterrey.

Roster

 Juan Bell 1999-2000
 Pete Rose Jr. 2003

New Cafeteros (2007)

The team name re-emerged in 2007 in the Veracruz Winter League and plays at the same stadium.

References

Baseball teams established in 1937
Defunct minor league baseball teams
Defunct baseball teams in Mexico
Córdoba, Veracruz
Baseball teams disestablished in 2006
Defunct Mexican League teams
1937 establishments in Mexico
2006 disestablishments in Mexico